El asadito  (English language:) is a 2000 Argentine black-and-white film drama directed and written by Gustavo Postiglione. The film premiered on 9 November 2000 in Buenos Aires and was nominated for two Silver Condor Awards for Best Cinematography and Best Film Editing in 2001.

Cast
Tito Gómez
Gerardo Dayub
Héctor Molina
Raúl Calandra
Carlos Resta
David Edery
Daniel Briguet
Pablo Fossa

External links
 

2000 films
Argentine black-and-white films
2000 drama films
Argentine independent films
2000s Spanish-language films
Argentine drama films
2000 independent films
2000s Argentine films